Carina Rozenfeld (born 13 February 1972 in Paris) is a French author who writes children's books in the science-fiction and fantasy genres.
In 2004, her first novel Lucille et les dragons sourds was published.

Publications
 Lucille et les dragons sourds, 2004
 Le Mystère Olphite, 2008.
 La Quête des Livre-Monde - tome 1 - Le Livre des Âmes, 2008
 Les Clefs de Babel, 2009
 La Quête des Livres Monde - tome 2 - Le Livre des Lieux, 2010
 À la poursuite des humutes, 2010
 Doregon, - tome 1 - Les Portes de Doregon, 2010
 Doregon, - tome 2 - La Guerre de l'ombre, 2011
 La Quête des Livres Monde - tome 3 - Le Livre du temps, 2012
 Doregon, - tome 3 - Les Cracheurs de lumière, 2012
 Phænix - tome 1 - Les Cendres de l'oubli, 2012
 Phænix - tome 2 - Le Brasier des souvenirs, 2013
 Les sentinelles du futur, 2013.

Miscellaneous
 Le Guide des 100 plus belles plages du monde, éd. Grands Voyageurs, 2004
 Le Guide du voyage de noces, éd. Grands Voyageurs, 2005
 Graines de voyageurs - Normandie, 2008

External links

 Official blog
 MySpace Page

1972 births
Living people
Writers from Paris
21st-century French novelists
French children's writers
French women children's writers
21st-century French women writers